Gottardo may refer to:

 Gottardo (train), express train connecting Zurich, Switzerland, with Milan, Italy

Person  
 Alexandra Gottardo, Indonesian model, film and television actress
 Daniele Gottardo, Italian guitarist and composer
 Wilson Gottardo, Brazilian former association footballer

See also 

 San Gottardo (disambiguation)
 Gotthard (disambiguation)